Mouloudia Sportive Populaire de Batna, known as MSP Batna or simply MSPB for short, is an Algerian football club based in the city of Batna, Algeria. The club was founded on 1962 and its colours are black, green and white. Their home stadium, Stade 1er Novembre, has a capacity of 20,000 spectators. The club is currently playing in the Algerian Ligue 2.

On August 5, 2020,  MSP Batna promoted to the Algerian Ligue 2.

Current squad

Honours
 Algerian Championnat National: 1
Runner-up (1): 1965
 Algerian Cup:
Finalist: 1989

References

External links

Football clubs in Algeria
Association football clubs established in 1962
Msp Batna
Algerian Ligue 2 clubs
1962 establishments in Algeria
Sports clubs in Algeria
Batna, Algeria